Gene Italiano is American singer Gene Pitney's eighth album, and first foreign language album, released on the Musicor label in 1964. The album features a number of Pitney's biggest early hits recorded in Italian, including "Twenty Four Hours From Tulsa", "Town Without Pity" and "Only Love Can Break a Heart".

Track listing 
"A Poche Ore Da Te (Twenty Four Hours From Tulsa)" (Hal David, Burt Bacharach) – 2:58
"Città Spietata (Town Without Pity)" (Dimitri Tiomkin, Ned Washington) – 2:53
"Un Soldino (If I Didn't Have A Dime)" (Bert Russell, Phil Medley) – 2:28
"Ritorna (Half Heaven, Half Heartache)" (Aaron Schroeder, George Goehring, Wally Gold) – 2:48
"Resta Sempre Accanto A Me (True Love Never Runs Smooth)" (David, Bacharach) – 2:25
"E Se Domani (If Tomorrow)" (Carlo Alberto Rossi, Giorgio Calabrese)– 2:51
"Che Sara Di Me (What Will Happen To Me)" – 2:11
"Quando Vedrai La Mia Ragazza (When You See My Girl)" (Enrico Ciacci) – 2:42
"E Quando Viene La Notte (Come The Night)" (Daniele Pace)– 2:53
"Non Lasciamoci (Only Love Can Break A Heart)" (David, Bacharach) – 2:51
"Foglie Morte (Autumn Leaves)" (Johnny Mercer, Joseph Kosma) – 2:36
"Vorrei Capire Perchè (Tell Me Why)" (Giuseppe Torrebruno, Leo Chiosso) – 2:15

EP track listing
An EP from the album Canta en Italiano was released by Hispavox in Spain
Amici Miei  	2:55
E Cuando Viene La Notte  	2:49
Saro Forte  	2:14
I Tuoi Anni Piu Belli  	3:07

References

1964 albums
Gene Pitney albums
Musicor Records albums